Moordorf  is a former municipality in the district of Steinburg, in Schleswig-Holstein, Germany. On March 1, 2008 Moordorf was incorporated into Westermoor.

Villages in Schleswig-Holstein
Former municipalities in Schleswig-Holstein